John Meirion Lloyd (Corris, Merionethshire 4 May 1913 - Prestatyn, 30 September 1998) was a Welsh Presbyterian missionary in Mizoram, India. He was ordained a minister of the Presbyterian Church of Wales 1941, and followed in the tradition of his countryman in Mizoram David Evan Jones (missionary). He was head of the team responsible for the Bible translation into the Mizo language in 1955.

Publications
 Y Bannau Pell (1989) - a history of the Mizoram Presbyterian Church in Welsh, with English and Mizo translations

References

External links
 Mizo Story.org

Welsh Presbyterians
Translators of the Bible into Mizo
1913 births
1988 deaths
20th-century translators